The Palais de Rumine is a late 19th-century building in Florentine Renaissance style in Lausanne, Switzerland.

History 

On his death, Gabriel de Rumine, son of Russian nobility, left the city of Lausanne 1.5 million Swiss Francs to erect a building for the use of the public.

Building began in 1892 according to the design of the Lyonnais architect Gaspard André. The Palais was inaugurated on 3 November 1902, although building work continued until 1904.

On 24 July 1923, the Treaty of Lausanne was signed in Palais de Rumine.

It housed facilities such as the library of the University of Lausanne, and scientific and artistic collections belonging to the Canton of Vaud. In the 1980s, the university moved to its current location by Lake Geneva due to lack of space, and the Palais was restructured.

Current use 

The building currently hosts one of the three sites of the Cantonal and University Library of Lausanne. Additionally, it contains the following museums:

 Musée cantonal des beaux-arts (Cantonal Museum of Fine Arts)
 Musée cantonal d'archéologie et d'histoire (Cantonal Museum of Archeology and History)
 Musée monétaire cantonal (Cantonal Museum of Money)
 Musée cantonal de géologie (Cantonal Museum of Geology)
 Musée cantonal de zoologie (Cantonal Museum of Zoology)

Gallery

See also 
 List of cultural property of national significance in Switzerland: Vaud
 University of Lausanne

Notes and references 

 Édouard Aynard, L'œuvre de Gaspard André, Lyon : A. Storck, 1898. p. 161- 168.

External links 

 Page on the website of the City of Lausanne

Museums in Lausanne
Palaces in Switzerland
Libraries in Switzerland
Library buildings completed in 1904
20th-century architecture in Switzerland